Athletes is a genus of moths in the family Saturniidae first described by Ferdinand Karsch in 1896.

Species
Athletes albicans Rougeot, 1955
Athletes ethra (Westwood, 1849)
Athletes gigas (Sonthonnax, 1902)
Athletes nyanzae Rebel, 1904
Athletes semialba (Sonthonnax, 1904)

References

Saturniinae
Moth genera